Rees Howells (10 October 1879 – 13 February 1950) was the founder of The Bible College of Wales.

Howells was born in Brynamman in Carmarthenshire, Wales. When he was 12 years old he left school and worked in a tin mill and coal mine. He later went to the USA for better financial benefits where he met a Jewish Christian named Maurice Reuben who was following the Messiah. Howells also read a book of Professor Henry Drummond. Both influences caused him to become an Evangelical Christian. Later he returned to Wales.  He was affected by the 1904-1905 Welsh Revival.

He and his wife were later missionaries in Africa. He was led down the path of intercession for many years, before seeing Revival across Southern Africa from 1915-1920.  The rise of Adolf Hitler and the outbreak of World War II also marked a period of strong activity in Howells' ministry of intercession.

They had only one child, a son, named Samuel Rees Howells, who later became the Director of the Bible College of Wales.

In 1924 he founded the Bible College of Wales in Swansea, Wales. After a long period of closure the College has now been purchased, refurbished and reopened by Cornerstone church based in Singapore.

Bibliography
Rees Howells Intercessor by Norman Grubb,  Philadelphia:Christian Literature Crusade, 1952.
The Intercession of Rees Howells by Doris M. Ruscoe, Cambridge: Lutterworth, 1983.
Samuel Rees Howells: A Life of Intercession by Richard Maton, ByFaith Media, 2012. The story of Rees Howells and how his son Samuel followed him to become an intercessor.
Samuel, Son and Successor of Rees Howells by Richard Maton, ByFaith Media, 2012. Covers much of the story of Rees Howells, his legacy and the influence Rees Howells had upon his son Samuel Rees Howells.

External links
Rees Howells Official website with old photos
Trinity School of Ministry

People from Brynamman
Protestant missionaries in Africa
Welsh Protestant missionaries
Welsh evangelicals
1879 births
1950 deaths